is a railway station in the city of Annaka, Gunma, Japan, operated by the East Japan Railway Company (JR East).

Lines

Station layout
The station has a two opposed side platforms connected to the station building by a footbridge. There is a third track in the middle for through traffic.

Platforms

History

The Usui Pass section of the railway closed on October 1, 1997. Yokokawa Station has been the terminus of the line since then.

The former Yokokawa locomotive depot for bank engines used on the Usui Pass was transformed into the Usui Pass Railway Heritage Park, which exhibits the bank engines (JNR Class EF63 electric locomotives) and other rolling stock.

JR BUS KANTO has been operating a route bus Usui Line which connects Karuizawa Station with this station as a bustitution of Shinetsu Main Line's closed section since 1997.

Passenger statistics
In fiscal 2019, the station was used by an average of 208 passengers daily (boarding passengers only).

Bus routes
JR BUS KANTO Usui Line
For Karuizawa Station
This bus route passes through Megane Bridge during autumn.

Surrounding area
 
 Yokogawa Post Office

References

External links
 
Station information (JR East) 

Shin'etsu Main Line
Railway stations in Gunma Prefecture
Railway stations in Japan opened in 1885
Stations of East Japan Railway Company
Annaka, Gunma